Qaryout is a Palestinian village of nearly 2,500 in the Nablus Governorate in the northern West Bank, located  southeast of Nablus.

According to the Palestinian Central Bureau of Statistics (PCBS), Qaryut had a population of 2,469 inhabitants in mid-year 2006.

Location
Qaryut  is located 17 km south of Nablus. It is bordered by Duma and Jalud to the east, Qusra and Talfit to the north, As Sawiya  to the west, and  Turmus'ayya to the south.

History
Shards from the Iron Age II, Persian, Persian/Hellenistic, Roman, Byzantine Crusader/Ayyubid and  Mamluk era have been found here.

Western travellers, like Edward Robinson,  have suggested that Qaryut might be identical to ancient Coreae.

It has also been suggested that Qaryut is identical with Kariateri, a place mentioned in Crusader texts.

It has been noted that: "This place, being at the head of Wady Fusail, seems to have given rise to the mediaeval identification of that valley as the Brook Cherith (mentioned by Marino Sanuto in 1321)."

Ottoman period
Potsherds from the early  Ottoman era have been found here.

In 1838, Kuriyet was noted as being located in El-Beitawy district, east of Nablus.

In 1870, Victor Guérin noted: "This village is divided into two distinct districts, each under the jurisdiction of a particular Sheikh. Its population is seven hundred and fifty inhabitants. In the gardens around it grow fig trees, pomegranates and vines. Several old rock formations are currently dry, and women are forced to fetch water as far as Ain Siloun. In two houses, I notice some blocks with boss cut." Guérin also identified Qaryut with ancient Coreae.

In 1882, the PEF's Survey of Western Palestine noted that Kuriyut was: "a small village, on the top of a high chain, with a spring between it and the ruin of Seilun (Shiloh)."

British Mandate
In the 1922 census of Palestine, conducted by the British Mandate authorities, Qariut had a population of 530  Muslims, increasing in the 1931 census  to 732; 3 Christians and 729 Muslims, in 156  houses. 

In the 1945 statistics  Qaryut had a population of 930, all Muslims,  with 7,491   dunams of land, according to an official land and population survey. Of this, 2,611 dunams were plantations and irrigable land, 2,803 were used for cereals, while 63 dunams were built-up land.

Jordanian period
In the wake of the 1948 Arab–Israeli War, and after the 1949 Armistice Agreements, Qaryut came  under Jordanian rule.

The Jordanian census of 1961 found 1,163 inhabitants.

1967, aftermath
Since the Six-Day War in 1967, Qaryut has been under Israeli occupation.

After the 1995 accords, 23% of village land is classified as Area B, the remaining 77% is Area C.

As of 2014, Israel has confiscated 2,221 dunams of Qaryat village land for 3 Israeli settlements: Eli, Shilo and Mizpe Rahel. 

Israeli settlers from Eli have been blamed for uprooting more than 100 olive trees belonging to Qaryut village.

Notable people
 Taysir Khalid (born 1941), Palestinian politician

References

Bibliography

External links
Welcome To Qaryut
Survey of Western Palestine, Map 14:    IAA, Wikimedia commons 
 Qaryut Village profile (including Jalud Locality),  Applied Research Institute–Jerusalem (ARIJ)
Qaryut, aerial photo, ARIJ
Development Priorities and Needs in Qaryut, ARIJ  

Villages in the West Bank
Municipalities of the State of Palestine